Baymak (Baymaq) is a town in the Republic of Bashkortostan, Russia, located in the upper streams of the Tanalyk River (Ural's basin)  south of Ufa. Population:

History
It was founded in 1913; town status was granted to it in 1938.

Administrative and municipal status
Within the framework of administrative divisions, Baymak serves as the administrative center of Baymaksky District, even though it is not a part of it. As an administrative division, it is incorporated separately as the town of republic significance of Baymak—an administrative unit with the status equal to that of the districts. As a municipal division, the town of republic significance of Baymak is incorporated within Baymaksky Municipal District as Baymak Urban Settlement.

Demographics
Ethnic composition:
Bashkirs: 69.8%
Russians: 23.1%
Tatars: 5.1%

References

Notes

Sources

External links
Official website of Baymak 
Directory of organizations in Baymak 

Cities and towns in Bashkortostan
Populated places established in 1913
1913 establishments in the Russian Empire